Kanbayashi Snowboard Park is a park located in Yamanouchi, Nagano, Japan. Constructed in 1995, it hosted the snowboarding half-pipe events for the 1998 Winter Olympics.

References
1998 Winter Olympics official report. Volume 2. pp. 209–11.
Shinmai.co.jp venue profile for the 1998 Winter Olympics.
Snowjapan.com profile
Worldsnowboardguide.com profile

Venues of the 1998 Winter Olympics
Olympic snowboarding venues
Ski areas and resorts in Japan
Sports venues in Nagano Prefecture